Amine Amiri (born 30 March 1994) is a former professional Moroccan snooker player.

Career
Amiri played on the World Snooker Tour for the first time in 2019–20, after winning a gold medal in the African Games. His first match as a professional came in the 2019 English Open where in the first round he lost 4–0 to Barry Hawkins.

Barring a second round exit in the 2020 Gibraltar Open, he exited in the first round of every tournament he entered over his two-year tour card. He also drew Judd Trump twice during his debut season, being whitewasted in both instances. With only one win to his name, he fell off the tour after the 2020-21 season and did not attempt to regain his tour card via the Q School.

Performance and rankings timeline

References

External links
Amine Amiri at worldsnooker.com

Living people
1994 births
Moroccan snooker players
African Games gold medalists for Morocco
African Games silver medalists for Morocco
Competitors at the 2019 African Games
20th-century Moroccan people
21st-century Moroccan people